S. cornutus may refer to:
 Saltuarius cornutus, a gecko species in the genus Saltuarius
 Syndesus cornutus, a beetle species in the genus Syndesus

Synonyms
 Sairocarpus cornutus, a synonym for Antirrhinum cornutum, the spurred snapdragon, a New World flowering plant species

See also
 Cornutus (disambiguation)